The  is a squadron of the Airborne Early Warning Surveillance Group of the Japan Air Self-Defense Force (JASDF) based at Hamamatsu Air Base in Shizuoka Prefecture, Japan. It is equipped with Boeing E-767 aircraft.

History
The squadron participated in the Cope North exercise for the first time in 2001. It has also participated in other years including 2003.

The squadron's aircraft have also taken part in the Red Flag - Alaska exercise, including in 2008, 2009, 2012 2014 and 2015.

In 2014 the JASDF ordered upgrades for the aircraft and its systems.

Aircraft operated
 Boeing E-767

References

Units of the Japan Air Self-Defense Force